Ingerana reticulata is a species of frog in the family Dicroglossidae. As presently known, it is endemic to Mêdog County in southeastern Tibet, China, but its range might extend to northeast India, given the proximity of the border. Common names reticulate eastern frog, reticulate wrinkled ground frog, and reticulated papillae-tongued frog have been coined for it.

Description
The tympanum is hidden under skin. Dorsal skin has reticulate skin ridges. The belly has transverse skin folds and is cream yellow in color, with sparse dark dots. The toes are partly webbed.

Habitat and conservation
Ingerana reticulata has been found among rocks next to small rivers and brooks within tropical moist forest. Development might be direct (i.e, there is no free-living larval stage), as in its relatives.

Ingerana reticulata is a rare and poorly known species. There are no known threats to it. It is present in the Yarlung Tsangpo Nature Reserve.

References

Ingerana
Frogs of China
Endemic fauna of Tibet
Amphibians described in 1984
Taxonomy articles created by Polbot
Taxa named by Zhao Ermi